Oktyabrsky is a rural locality (a selo) and the administrative centre of Shemyaksky Selsoviet, Ufimsky District, Bashkortostan, Russia. The population was 1,663 as of 2010. There are 20 streets.

Geography 
Oktyabrsky is located 43 km west of Ufa (the district's administrative centre) by road. Shemyak is the nearest rural locality.

References 

Rural localities in Ufimsky District